Poomphat Sarapisitphat, formerly Meedech Sarayuthpisai is a Thai professional footballer who plays for Nakhon Si United.

External links
 

1988 births
Living people
Poomphat Sarapisitphat
Association football defenders
Poomphat Sarapisitphat
Poomphat Sarapisitphat
Poomphat Sarapisitphat
Nakhon Si United F.C. players